This is a list of Marist Red Foxes players in the NFL Draft.

Key

Selections

References

Lists of National Football League draftees by college football team

Marist Red Foxes NFL Draft